Divina Grace D'Anna (born 5 December 1976) is an Australian politician. She has been a Labor member of the Western Australian Legislative Assembly since the 2021 state election, representing Kimberley.

A Yawuru, Nimanburr and Bardi woman, D'Anna  was born and grew up in Broome, Western Australia.

In August 2020 she was selected to replace the retiring sitting member, Josie Farrer. In her election campaign D'Anna received mentoring from  Senator Malarndirri McCarthy through EMILY's List Australia.

References

External links 

 
 

 

Living people
1976 births 
Australian Labor Party members of the Parliament of Western Australia
Members of the Western Australian Legislative Assembly
Women members of the Western Australian Legislative Assembly
Indigenous Australian politicians
21st-century Australian politicians
21st-century Australian women politicians